Cowplain is a village north of Waterlooville, Hampshire, England. With a population of 9,353 at the 2011 census, it makes up above 7% of Havant borough's population. It grew along the old London to Portsmouth road (the A3) on which the village centre and local shops lie.

Geography
Cowplain is surrounded by remnants of the ancient Forest of Bere: The Queens Inclosure, Padnell Cuts Woods, Idlewood, Hurstwood and Park Woods.

The nearest town is Waterlooville and the nearest villages are Lovedean, Rowlands Castle, Denmead and Horndean. A Portsmouth city council housing estate, Wecock Farm (built in the 1970s), is west of Cowplain village.

Amenities
The village schools are Cowplain Community School, Padnell Infant, Padnell Junior Schools, and Queen's Inclosure Primary School, adjacent to the Queen's Inclosure woods. The local church is St Wilfrid's, although there are a number of others in the area including Cowplain Evangelical Church.

Cowplain has a supermarket and a number of places to eat, including The Spotted Cow, built in the 1930s when the original Spotted Cow was demolished and rebuilt.

The nearest golf course is Waterloovile Golf Course.

Transport
A number of bus routes go through Cowplain: the 37 (Stagecoach) from Havant to Clanfield, Petersfield and Liss, the National Express 030 to London and First Group service 8. The number 8 route follows the A3 from Clanfield to Gunwharf Quays in Portsmouth.

Notable people
 Mark Wingett, actor known for playing Police Constable Jim Carver in The Bill 
 Jill Ellis, English-American football coach

References

External links

Villages in Hampshire